Tour Bus is an Israeli transportation company and a major shareholder in several Israeli bus companies, such as Metropoline and Metrodan Beersheba.

Under the brand Tour Bus, the company provides buses to transport passengers to and from flights in the Ben Gurion International Airport.

External links
Official website 

Bus companies of Israel